Golińsk  is a village in the administrative district of Gmina Mieroszów, within Wałbrzych County, Lower Silesian Voivodeship, in south-western Poland, near the border with the Czech Republic.

Göhlenau was the birthplace of Günther Viezenz, a famous German Oberleutnant who singlehandedly destroyed 21 enemy tanks during the Second World War, receiving the tank destruction badge 4 times in gold and once in silver along with other decorations.

References

Villages in Wałbrzych County